Sultan Sir Alaeddin Sulaiman Shah Ibni Al-Marhum Raja Musa  (11 September 1863 – 31 March 1938) was the fifth Sultan of Selangor from 1898 until 1938. He was previously known as Raja Sulaiman before being crowned Sultan.

Sultan Sulaiman was appointed a Knight Commander of the Order of St Michael and St George (KCMG) in 1912 and later the Knight Grand Cross of the Order of St Michael and St George (GCMG) in 1929 by the United Kingdom with the title Sir.

The Sultan's rule was marked by Selangor joining the Federated Malay States, a federation of four protectorates in the Malay Peninsula, including Perak, Negeri Sembilan and Pahang, established by the British government in 1895, which lasted until 1946.

It was during Sultan Sulaiman's reign that Istana Alam Shah was built in 1905. The Sultan went on to live in the palace for 35 years until his death in 1938.

Succession dispute

Sultan Alaeddin Sulaiman Shah had many children, his first three sons in chronological order being Tengku Musa Eddin, Tengku Badar Shah and Tengku Alam Shah. The first two sons were children by his royal consort, Tengku Ampuan Maharum binti Tengku Dhiauddin of the royal house of Kedah. In 1903, Tengku Musa Eddin had been made Tengku Mahkota and was promoted to Raja Muda or heir apparent in 1920.

However, at the instigation of the British Resident, Theodore Samuel Adams (1885–1961; in office 1935 - 1937), Tengku Musa Eddin was dismissed as Raja Muda  in 1934 for alleged "misbehaviour". Adams had accused Tengku Musa Eddin as a spendthrift and wastrel with a penchant for gambling. However, many Malays in Selangor believed the real reason for Tengku Musa Eddin's dismissal was his refusal to follow Adam's orders.

Although Sultan Sulaiman pleaded for the case of Tengku Musa Eddin (even petitioning the Secretary of State for the Colonies and discussing the issue directly with him in London), Tengku Alam Shah was instead proclaimed Raja Muda heir to the throne over the head of his other half-brother Tengku Badar. The appointment occurred on 20 July 1936.

Tengku Alam Shah was proclaimed Sultan on 4 April 1938, four days after the death of Sultan Sulaiman. On 26 January 1939, he was crowned at Istana Mahkota Puri in Klang. Tengku Musa Eddin, then Tengku Kelana Jaya Putera, presided over the ceremony with no ill feelings.

Marriages and issue

Sulaiman married eleven times, and has overall 44 issues; 26 sons and 18 daughters.

He first married Tengku Ampuan Paduka Seri Negara Tunku Maharum binti Tunku Ziauddin @ Tengku Kudin of Kedah, his first cousin, on 15 March 1891 until her death on 1908. She became his royal consort. They had four children together, one son and four daughters. Their four daughters received the title Tengku Puteri after his coronation to the throne on 4 November 1903. Their only son became the seventh Sultan of Selangor.
 Musa Ghiatuddin Riayat Shah of Selangor (born 1893, died 1955)
 Tengku Puteri Maheran (born 1894, died 1981)
 Tengku Puteri Fatimah (born 1896, died 1968)
 Tengku Puteri Arfah (born 1898, died 1961)
 Tengku Puteri Zaharah, Tengku Permaisuri Langkat (born 1899, died 1982)

He secondly married Cik Hasnah @ Aminah binti Pilong  1895. They were blessed with four children, two son and two daughters. Their second son became the sixth Sultan of Selangor, and the second Yang di-Pertuan Agong of Malaysia.
 Tengku Badar Shah, Tengku Bendahara (born 1893, died 1945)
 Tengku Badariah (born 1896, died 1937)
 Hisamuddin of Selangor (born 1898, died 1960)
 Tengku Salwa, Tengku Puan Panglima Diraja (born 1901, died 1972)

He then married his third consort, Cik Sofia binti Abdul Ghani on 1899. They had no children together.

His fourth marriage is to Cik Rogayah binti Muhammad Amin, c. 1908. The marriage ended with her death on 1909. The couple only has one child, a son.
 Tengku Abdul Aziz Shah, Tengku Indera Setia Diraja (born 1909, died 1922)

He married Cik Chik binti Abdullah c. 1908 (d. 11 June 1949) as his fifth wife. They have seven children, three sons and four daughters. They also adopted a daughter.
 Tengku Khadijah (born 1909, died 2001)
 Tengku Ahmad Alham Shah, Tengku Pahlawan Diraja (born 1911, died 1991)
 Tengku Muhammad Khalid Shah, Tengku Indera Bijaya Diraja (born 1914)
 Tengku Safiah (born 1923)
 Tengku Mahyun (born 1924, died in childhood)
 Tengku Yaacob Shah (born 1925, died 1959)
 Tengku Aziah (born 1926)
 Cik Uteh Surau binti Abdullah (adopted)

He married Tengku Ampuan Raja Zubaidah binti Abdul Jalil of Perak on May 1910, and she became his second royal consort. The marriage didn't last long as she died only eight years after the marriage on 17 October 1918. The couple have six children, four sons and two daughters.
 Tengku Zainal Karib Shah, Tengku Panglima Besar (born 1911, died 1984)
 Tengku Zainal @ Zainon Rashid Shah, Tengku Seri Paduka Diraja (born 1913, died 1989)
 Tengku Nur Ashiha (born 1914)
 Tengku Nur Aishah (born 1915, died 1962)
 Tengku Ibrahim Shah, Tengku Seri Wangsa Diraja (born 1916)
 Tengku Idris Shah, Tengku Seri Paduka Shah Bandar (born 1918)

He married for the seventh time c. 1910, to Cik Anjung Negara Maimunah binti Abdullah. They have five children, four sons and a daughter. Their eldest son died in infancy.
Tengku Ibrahim
 Tengku Raihani (born 1911, died 1993)
 Tengku Muhammad Uzab @ Muzab Shah, Tengku Perdana Diraja (born 1915)
 Tengku Abdul Halim Shah, Tengku Seri Maharaja Diraja (born 1918, died 1985)
 Tengku Mahmud Shah (born 1925)

He married his eighth wife Cik Puri Negara Bidayah binti Ahmad c. 1912. They have five children together, three sons and two daughters.
 Tengku Akram Shah, Tengku Seri Asmara Diraja (born 1913)
 Tengku Zahariah (born 1916)
 Tengku Shaharuddin Shah, Tengku Seri Andika Diraja (born 1918)
 Tengku Muhammad Tahir (born 1923)
 Tengku Shaharul Bariah (born 1924)

In September 1921, he married Tengku Ampuan Paduka Seri Negara Raja Fatimah binti Idris Murshidul Azzam Shah of Perak who became his third royal consort. They have five children, two sons and three daughters.
 Tengku Nur Saadah (born 1922)
 Tengku Nur Anwar (born 1924)
 Tengku Nur Ashikin Khaladiah (born 1925, died 2013)
 Tengku Muhammad Yusuf Shah, Tengku Arif Temenggong (born 1926, died 2018)
 Tengku Abdul Rahman (born 1927)

He married Tengku Besar Seri Negara Raja Mariam @ Bulat binti Raja Ahmad c. 1925. They have four children, all of them are male.
 Tengku Abdul Jalil Shah, Tengku Seri Perkasa (born 1926)
 Tengku Abdul Murad Shah (born 1928)
 Tengku Abdul Hamid Shah (born 1930)
 Tengku Abdul Samad Shah (born 1933)

He married for the eleventh and the last time c. 1933 to Cik Johari binti Abdullah. She bore their last two sons.
 Tengku Harun Shah (born 1934)
 Tengku Azlan Shah (born 1936)

Legacy
Several places have been named after him, including:
 Sulaiman Building, Kuala Lumpur, formerly housing the Syariah Court of Malaysia, presently the Asian International Arbitration Centre
 Sultan Sulaiman Mosque in Klang, Selangor
 Alaeddin Mosque (Jugra, Malaysia)
 Kolej Sultan Alaeddin Suleiman Shah, a residential college at Universiti Putra Malaysia, Serdang, Selangor
 SMK Sultan Sulaiman Shah, a secondary school in Bestari Jaya, Selangor
 Jalan Sultan Sir Alaeddin Suleiman Shah in Shah Alam, Selangor

Notes

References

Sources 

Knights Grand Cross of the Order of St Michael and St George
Malaysian people of Malay descent
Knights Commander of the Royal Victorian Order
Malaysian people of Bugis descent
1863 births
1938 deaths
Sulaiman
19th-century monarchs in Asia